Michaela Baudyšová (born 16 January 1998 in Prague) is a Czech curler.

At the national level, she is a two-time Czech women's champion (2020, 2022) curler and a two-time Czech mixed champion (2018, 2019).

Personal life
As of 2021 she is a chemistry/chemical technologies student. Her sister, Alžběta Zelingrová, is also a curler.

Teams

Women's

Mixed

Mixed doubles

References

External links

Baudyšová Michaela (CC SOKOL LIBOC) - Player statistics - Czech Curling Association
Video: 

Living people
1998 births
Sportspeople from Prague
Czech female curlers
Czech curling champions
Competitors at the 2019 Winter Universiade
21st-century Czech women